Carl-Anders Dymling (1898-1961) was a Swedish film producer and director.

Biography
Dymling became a Candidate of Philosophy at the University of Gothenburg in 1921 and a Philosophy Licentiate in literary history in 1925.
In 1931 he became head of  Radioteatern in Stockholm.
Between 1942 and his death in 1961, he was President of Svensk Filmindustri, heading the county's largest film company. He initiated a policy of making prestigious, artistic productions that was less than successful. Although he was resistant to the making of the melodrama Sunshine Follows Rain, based on Margit Söderholm's novel, the 1946 release turned out to be the company's most profitable film of the sound era.

References

Bibliography 
 Gunnar Iverson, Astrid Soderbergh Widding & Tytti Soila. Nordic National Cinemas. Routledge, 2005.

External links 
 

1898 births
1961 deaths
People from Gothenburg
University of Gothenburg alumni
Swedish film producers
Burials at Norra begravningsplatsen